Kameron Hurley is an American science fiction and fantasy writer.

Biography 
Hurley was born in Washington state and has lived in Fairbanks, Alaska, Durban, South Africa, and Chicago. She currently resides in Dayton, Ohio.

Hurley has been publishing short fiction since 1998 and novels since 2011. From 2013 to 2021 Hurley wrote regular columns for Locus magazine about the craft and business of fiction writing and has published non-fiction pieces in The Atlantic, Boing Boing, Entertainment Weekly, Bitch (magazine), Tor.com, Uncanny Magazine, HuffPost, The Mary Sue, Female First, Writer's Digest, and LA Weekly. Hurley is a graduate of Clarion West.

Her first novel trilogy, the Bel Dame Apocrypha, is what Hurley called "bugpunk": set on a far-future desert planet whose technology is based on insects and whose matriarchal, Islam-inspired cultures are locked in perpetual war. Her second trilogy, the Worldbreaker Saga, is grimdark epic fantasy that aims to subvert the genre's tropes such as the hero's journey. She has also published a standalone space opera novel, The Stars are Legion, in 2017, and the military science fiction time travel novel, The Light Brigade, in 2019.

Her first nonfiction book, the essay collection The Geek Feminist Revolution, was published in 2016.

Awards and nominations

David Palumbo's cover art for Hurley's novel God’s War (part of the Bel Dame Apocrypha series) was nominated for the Chesley Award for Best Cover Illustration – Paperback and won Gold in the 2011 Spectrum Award - Books.

Bibliography

Novels
 The Stars Are Legion - Saga Press, 2017
 The Light Brigade - Saga Press, 2019

The Bel Dame Apocrypha 
 God’s War - Night Shade Books, 2011
 Infidel - Night Shade Books, 2011
 Rapture - Night Shade Books, 2012

Worldbreaker Saga 
 The Mirror Empire - Angry Robot, 2014
 Empire Ascendant - Angry Robot, 2015
The Broken Heavens - Angry Robot, 2020

Short fiction

Collections 
 Brutal Women: Short Stories - 2010
 Apocalypse Nyx - Tachyon Publications, 2018 (The Bel Dame Apocrypha)
 Meet Me in the Future: Stories - Tachyon Publications, 2019
 Future Artifacts - Apex Books, 2022

Stories

Nonfiction
 "Locus Commentary" series, Locus, Locus Publications, 2013-2018
 "On the Business of Writing, Creativity, and Burnout", Journey Planet, issue #15, ed. James Bacon, Christopher J. Garcia, and Lynda E. Rucker, 2013
 
 "We Have Always Fought: Challenging the Women, Cattle and Slave Narrative", Lightspeed, issue 49, ed. Christie Yant, Lightspeed Magazine, 2014
 "Language and Imaginative Resistance in Epic Fantasy", Fantasy Magazine, issue 58, ed. Cat Rambo, Fantasy Magazine, 2014
 "I Don't Care About Your MFA: On Writing vs. Storytelling", Uncanny Magazine, issue 4, ed. Lynne M. Thomas and Michael Damian Thomas, Uncanny Magazine, 2015
 "Creating Better Fantasy Economies", Fantasy-Faction Anthology ed. Marc Aplin and Jennie Ivins, Fantasy-Faction, 2015
 The Geek Feminist Revolution, Tor Books, 2016
 "The Sad Economics of Writing Short Fiction", Locus, ed. Liza Groen Trombi, Locus Publications, 2016
 "Why I'm Not Afraid of the Internet", Orson Scott Card's Intergalactic Medicine Show, issue #51, ed. Edmund R. Schubert, Hatrack River Enterprises, 2016
 "Fear, Procrastination, and the Thorny Problem of Demanding What You're Worth", Locus, ed. Liza Groen Trombi, Locus Publications, 2017
 "On Patience, Goal-setting, and Gardening", Locus, ed. Liza Groen Trombi, Locus Publications, 2018
 "An Introduction: Meet Me in the Future", Meet Me in the Future by Kameron Hurley, Tachyon Publications, 2019
 "It's Okay if This Email Finds You Well", Locus, ed. Liza Groen Trombi, Locus Publications, 2020

References

External links 
 Kameron Hurley's Official Website
 People Don’t Buy Books They Don’t Know About (Even Great Ones) by Kameron Hurley, Locus Online 28 August 2014

 

American science fiction writers
Living people
21st-century American novelists
21st-century American women writers
Women science fiction and fantasy writers
Hugo Award-winning fan writers
Hugo Award-winning writers
American women novelists
Year of birth missing (living people)
American feminist writers
American fantasy writers
Novelists from Washington (state)